Select a region on the graphical atlas to view a list of the fossiliferous stratigraphic units in that area of the United States.

Graphical atlas

See also

 Paleontology in the United States
 Lists of fossiliferous stratigraphic units in North America
 Lists of fossiliferous stratigraphic units

Notes

References 

Fossiliferous
Stratigraphy of the United States
United States